Silver Canyon is a valley in the U.S. state of Nevada.

Silver Canyon was named from deposits of silver ore in the area.

References

Valleys of Lincoln County, Nevada